The Switzerland men's national under-20 basketball team is a national basketball team of Switzerland, administered by the Swiss Basketball. It represents the country in international men's under-20 basketball competitions.

FIBA U20 European Championship participations

See also
Switzerland men's national basketball team
Switzerland men's national under-18 basketball team
Switzerland women's national under-20 basketball team

References

External links
Archived records of Switzerland team participations

Basketball in Switzerland
Basketball
Men's national under-20 basketball teams